Future in fiction can refer to
Far future in fiction:
Near future in fiction
Science fiction